Ivan Remarenco (born 7 August 1988 in Goleni, Moldova) is a Moldovan born-Emirati judoka. He competed at the 2012 Summer Olympics for Moldova in the -90 kg event. He moved up in weight category to -100 kg.  He represented the United Arab Emirates at the 2014 World Judo Championships and won a bronze medal.  He again represented the UAE at the 2016 Summer Olympics.

References

External links
 
 

Emirati male judoka
Moldovan male judoka
1988 births
Living people
Olympic judoka of Moldova
Judoka at the 2012 Summer Olympics
Judoka at the 2016 Summer Olympics
Olympic judoka of the United Arab Emirates
Judoka at the 2018 Asian Games
Asian Games competitors for the United Arab Emirates
Islamic Solidarity Games medalists in judo
Emirati people of Moldovan descent
Judoka at the 2020 Summer Olympics